Irchester railway station was built by the Midland Railway in 1857 on its extension from  to  and  in England.

The station building was built on an overbridge. It closed for passenger traffic in 1960, and for goods in 1965.

The Irchester Bank is one of the steepest of five summit levels between Leicester and Bedford. The surrounding country provided important traffic to the line in the form of ironstone for the smelters in Derbyshire.

In the early twentyfirst century local campaigners argued for the station to be reopened to serve as a 'park and ride' station for the nearby town of Rushden.

Route

See also
 Rushden Parkway railway station

References

Disused railway stations in Northamptonshire
Former Midland Railway stations
Railway stations in Great Britain opened in 1857
Railway stations in Great Britain closed in 1960
Charles Henry Driver railway stations
1857 establishments in England
North Northamptonshire